Antena Radio Jelah or Antena Radio Tešanj is a Bosnian local commercial radio station, broadcasting from Jelah-Tešanj, Bosnia and Herzegovina. This radio station broadcasts a variety of programs such music and local news.

It was founded on 8 December 1998 as the first private radio station in Tešanj municipality by the company Antena d.o.o. Tešanj.

Program is mainly produced in Bosnian language at one FM frequency (Tešanj ) and it is available in the city of Tešanj as well as in nearby (northern) municipalities in Zenica-Doboj Canton area.

Estimated number of listeners of Antena Radio Jelah is around 153.551.

Frequencies
 Tešanj

See also 
 List of radio stations in Bosnia and Herzegovina
 Antena Sarajevo
 Radio Zenica
 Radio Tešanj
 Radio Doboj
 Radio Usora

References

External links 
 www.ant.ba
 www.antena-radio.ba
 www.radiostanica.ba
 www.fmscan.org
 Communications Regulatory Agency of Bosnia and Herzegovina
Mass media in Tešanj
Tešanj
Radio stations established in 1998